N81 may refer to:
 N81 (Long Island bus)
 Hammonton Municipal Airport, in Atlantic County, New Jersey, United States
 N81 highway (Philippines)
 N81 road (Ireland)
 Nokia N81, a mobile phone